Imbestigador is a Philippine television investigative docudrama show broadcast by GMA Network. Hosted by Mike Enriquez, it premiered on August 2, 2000 on the network's evening line up replacing Compañero y Compañera.

The series is streaming online on YouTube.

Overview

The show premiered on August 2, 2000. It began with very casual crime scene reports, which continues to be the usual focus. Various crimes were featured, including kidnapping, slavery, child abuse, and various drug-related crimes. The team was equipped with hidden cameras for doing entrapment operations with the help of the Philippine National Police, the Department of Social Welfare and Development, the Commission on Human Rights, the National Bureau of Investigation, the Department of Justice and the Philippine Drug Enforcement Agency.

From crime reports, Imbestigador expanded into an all-around investigative show. It features societal problems such as corruption, problems in local governments, illegal activities, poverty, disloyalty, cleanliness, education, wasted public funds, the youth and public health and safety. The show started dramatizations on July 19, 2014.

Production
In March 2020, production was halted due to the enhanced community quarantine in Luzon caused by the COVID-19 pandemic. The show resumed its programming on July 11, 2020.

Accolades

References

External links
 
 
 
 

2000 Philippine television series debuts
Filipino-language television shows
GMA Network original programming
GMA Integrated News and Public Affairs shows
Investigative journalism
Philippine crime television series
Philippine documentary television series
Philippine television docudramas
Television productions suspended due to the COVID-19 pandemic